Wu Ashun (born 22 June 1985) is a Chinese professional golfer. He has won four times on the European Tour and twice on the Japan Golf Tour.

Professional career
Wu played on the Asian Tour in 2008 and 2009. His best finish was T-4 at the 2009 Singha Thailand Open.

Wu played on the Japan Golf Tour in 2010 and from 2012 to 2015. He won his first title in September 2012 at the Toshin Golf Tournament in Ryosen. He was the first golfer from China to win on the Japan Golf Tour. 

Wu played on the OneAsia Tour in 2011, finishing 19th on the Order of Merit for that season. 

In 2013, Wu won for the second time on the Japan Golf Tour, with a one-stroke victory at the Heiwa PGM Championship. 

In April 2015, Wu won the Volvo China Open on the European Tour. He made history as he became the first Chinese player to win a European Tour event on home soil.

Since 2016, Wu has played primarily on the European Tour. In 2016 he won the Lyoness Open and in 2018 he had a third European Tour win, in the KLM Open, which made him the first Chinese player to win three times on the European Tour.

In March 2022, Wu picked up his fourth European Tour victory at the Magical Kenya Open. A final-round 65 saw him beat Aaron Cockerill, Thriston Lawrence and Hurly Long by four shots.

Professional wins (6)

European Tour wins (4)

1Co-sanctioned by the OneAsia Tour

Japan Golf Tour wins (2)

*Note: The 2012 Toshin Golf Tournament in Ryosen was shortened to 54 holes due to weather.

Japan Golf Tour playoff record (1–0)

OneAsia Tour wins (1)

1Co-sanctioned by the European Tour

Results in major championships

CUT = missed the half-way cut

Results in World Golf Championships
Results not in chronological order before 2015.

"T" = tied

Team appearances
Royal Trophy (representing Asia): 2012 (winners), 2013
World Cup (representing China): 2013, 2016, 2018
EurAsia Cup (representing Asia): 2016

References

External links

Chinese male golfers
Japan Golf Tour golfers
Olympic golfers of China
Golfers at the 2016 Summer Olympics
Golfers at the 2020 Summer Olympics
Golfers at the 2006 Asian Games
Asian Games competitors for China
People from Xiamen
1985 births
Living people
20th-century Chinese people
21st-century Chinese people